Nick Grigg (born 18 September 1992) is a rugby union player, who currently plays as a midfield back for US Carcassonne in the French Pro D2 competition. Grigg was born and raised in New Zealand, but has represented Scotland – for which he is eligible due to his Scottish heritage – both in the fifteen-a-side form of the game and rugby sevens.

Rugby union career

Amateur career

He previously played for Petone and for the under-20 Wellington side in New Zealand.

When not playing for Glasgow Warriors, Grigg plays for Stirling County.

Grigg has been drafted to Stirling County in the Scottish Premiership for the 2017–18 season.

Professional career

He was part of the Hurricanes Development XV in New Zealand.

Grigg trialled with the Warriors in March 2015 before signing for Glasgow Warriors and securing a place at the Scottish Rugby Academy for Glasgow District as a Stage 3 player. Membership of the academy is restricted to Scottish-Qualified players. Stage 3 players are aligned to a professional club and given regional support.

He has played for Glasgow Warriors in their pre-season match against Clermont. The Warriors lost the match 28–10.

He also featured in an early season friendly against the British Army Rugby Union side. Glasgow Warriors beat the Army side 71–0.

He started in the derby match against Edinburgh in an 'A' match at Broadwood Stadium. Glasgow Warriors beat Edinburgh, 26–5. He made his competitive debut for the Glasgow side on 18 March 2016 against Leinster at Scotstoun Stadium in the Pro12 in a 12 - 6 victory for the Scottish side. He became Glasgow Warrior No. 262.

He graduated from the Scottish Rugby Academy and signed a professional contract with Glasgow Warriors on 23 March 2016.

He was named in the Pro14 dream team for the 2017–18 season.

He made 95 appearances for the Warriors, scoring 20 tries for the side.

It was announced in December 2021 that Grigg would join Japanese side Osaka Red Hurricanes in 2022, joining the club in the new year.

Grigg said of the move:

Playing for Glasgow Warriors has completely changed my life for the better and I’ve loved every minute of it. It was such a scary thing to do to leave your home country and to move to the other side of the world, but the prospect of playing at Glasgow Warriors and playing professional rugby was too good to turn down. It’s been so good being a Glasgow Warrior. Everyone who comes into the club comments on how good the environment here is – the players, the people and the culture – and I’ve got to experience than that for six years. It’s what makes this club so special and it’s going to be sad to leave.

There have been a lot of highlights for me both on and off the pitch at Glasgow. I’ll always remember my first cap against Leinster back in March 2016, and my 50th against Scarlets when we went down to 14 men early on and still got the victory – there have been so many amazing moments. It’s sad to leave Glasgow but I’m looking forward to my next adventure. Danny [Wilson], Al [Kellock] and my agent Tom Beattie have worked hard and given me the chance to take this new opportunity – it’s a fresh start for me.

I’ll be closer to home and my family, and I get to experience a new culture. Again, it’s quite scary but when I made that move here it completely changed my life. I’m going to miss Glasgow, the fans and the boys but it’s going to be another amazing experience to move over to Japan and play rugby.

On 29 July 2022, Grigg was named in the  squad for the 2022 Bunnings NPC season. He made his debut for the province on 6 August 2022 against .

On 6 October 2022, it was announced that Grigg signed an injury replacement contract with French side US Carcassonne to play in the Pro D2, where he joined with fellow ex-Scotland international and ex-Glasgow Warrior Rob Harley. He made his debut for Carcassonne on 7 October 2022 against Massy.

International career

He is Scottish-qualified as his grandfather is from Ayrshire.

On 25 January 2016, Grigg was named in the Scotland Sevens squad for the upcoming Wellington Sevens tournament. He made his international debut in the tournament, confirming his Scottish nationality, on 30 January 2016. He played against South Africa, coming off the bench for his debut.

Grigg made his international XV debut for Scotland against Fiji on 24 June 2017 (3.30am BST).

References

External links 
itsrugby.co.uk profile
Japan Rugby League One 2022 player statistics
Glasgow Warriors biography

1992 births
Living people
Rugby union players from Wellington City
New Zealand rugby union players
Scottish rugby union players
Male rugby sevens players
Scotland international rugby sevens players
Scotland international rugby union players
Rugby union centres
Stirling County RFC players
Glasgow Warriors players
NTT DoCoMo Red Hurricanes Osaka players
Hawke's Bay rugby union players
US Carcassonne players